Avanathankottai  is a village in the  
Aranthangi revenue block of Pudukkottai district, Tamil Nadu, India.

Demographics 

As per the 2001 census, Avanam attrankottai had a total population of 2329 with 1164 males and 1165 females. Out of the total population 1661 people were literate.

References

Villages in Pudukkottai district